Joe Hrudka is a pioneering American gasser drag racer.

Driving a 1957 Chevrolet, he won NHRA's D/Gas national title at  Indianapolis Raceway Park in 1961.

The next year, at the wheel of the Peters & Betz team's 1955 Chevrolet (with a transplanted Chevrolet engine), he won a second NHRA DGas national title at Indianapolis.

In 1967, the Hrudka Brothers' 1933 Willys panel delivery was a popular wheelstander.

Hrudka would later found Mr. Gasket (now a division of Holley Performance Products.

References

Sources
Davis, Larry. Gasser Wars.  North Branch, MN:  Cartech, 2003, p. 181.

Dragster drivers
American racing drivers